Memoir is a literary genre or a reminiscence, a subclass of autobiography.

Memoir may also refer to:

Autobiographical texts
Memoir (McGahern book), a 2005 autobiographical account of the childhood of Irish author John McGahern
Memoirs (Kennan book), a 1967 book that won the 1968 Pulitzer Prize
Memoirs (Walter Scott), a short autobiographical work by Walter Scott
Mémoires (Berlioz) (aka Mémoires de Hector Berlioz), an autobiography by French composer Hector Berlioz
Mémoires, a 1959 artists' book by Guy Debord and Asger Jorn
Memoirs: 1939–1993, a memoir written by the former Prime Minister of Canada Brian Mulroney

Professional society journals
For example:
Memoirs and Proceedings of the Chemical Society, a scientific journal published at various times by the U.K. Chemical Society
Memoirs of the American Mathematical Society, a mathematical journal in which each memoir is normally a single, separately bound monograph

Music
European Memoirs (aka Memoir), a 1982 jazz album by the Toshiko Akiyoshi – Lew Tabackin Big Band
Memoire (album) (or Memoire DX), the debut album by Japanese rock band Malice Mizer
Memoirs (Rox album), the debut album by British singer Rox
Memoirs (jazz album), a 1990 album by Paul Bley, Charlie Haden and Paul Motian
"Memoir", a song by Audio Adrenaline from the 1996 album Bloom
Memoirs, a 2002 album by the Third and the Mortal

Other uses
Mémoire, in French culture, a (usually short and incisive) piece of writing allowing the author to show his or her opinion on a given subject
Mémoires, a 1959 artist's book made by the French artist and theorist Guy Debord in collaboration with the Danish artist Asger Jorn
Memoir '44, a light war-themed strategy board game
 Memoirs v. Massachusetts, a 1966 U.S. Supreme Court obscenity case
 Memoir (horse)
 Memoirs (film), a 1984 drama film